Matvei Igonen (born 2 October 1996) is an Estonian professional footballer who plays as a goalkeeper for Podbeskidzie Bielsko-Biała and the Estonia national team.

Club career

FCI Tallinn
Igonen made his Meistriliiga debut on 16 March 2013, in a 1–1 draw against Flora.

Lillestrøm
On 5 January 2018, Igonen signed a three-year contract with Norwegian club Lillestrøm.

Flora
On 1 July 2019, Igonen joined Estonian club Flora on a half-year loan.

In July 2020 he signed a permanent deal with Flora until the end of 2021.

Podbeskidzie Bielsko-Biała
From 2022 he plays for Polish club Podbeskidzie Bielsko-Biała having made 1 and a half year deal.

International career
Igonen made his senior international debut for Estonia on 23 November 2017, keeping a clean sheet in a 1–0 victory over Vanuatu in a friendly.

Honours

Club
FCI Tallinn
Meistriliiga: 2016
Esiliiga: 2012
Estonian Cup: 2016–17
Estonian Supercup: 2017

Flora
Meistriliiga: 2019

References

External links

1996 births
Living people
Footballers from Tallinn
Estonian footballers
Estonian people of Russian descent
Association football goalkeepers
Esiliiga players
Meistriliiga players
I liga players
FCI Tallinn players
Eliteserien players
Lillestrøm SK players
FC Flora players
Podbeskidzie Bielsko-Biała players
Estonia youth international footballers
Estonia under-21 international footballers
Estonia international footballers
Estonian expatriate footballers
Estonian expatriate sportspeople in Norway
Expatriate footballers in Norway
Estonian expatriate sportspeople in Poland
Expatriate footballers in Poland